Virginia is a township in Warren County, Iowa, USA.

History
Many of the early settlers of Virginia Township hailed from Virginia, hence the name.

References

Townships in Warren County, Iowa
Townships in Iowa